The West Middlesex Area School District is a small, rural public school district serving the southwestern portion of Mercer County, Pennsylvania. It encompasses the communities of West Middlesex, Shenango Township, and Lackawannock Township. The district operates on a single 40-acre campus. According to 2000 federal census data, it served a resident population of 7,527. By 2010, the district's population declined to 7,454 people. In 2009, the district residents’ per capita income was $16,870, while the median family income was $40,558. In the Commonwealth, the median family income was $49,501 and the United States median family income was $49,445, in 2010.

West Middlesex Area School District operates three schools: Luther W Low Elementary School, Oakview Elementary School and West Middlesex Area Junior Senior High School. The district is one of the 500 public school districts of Pennsylvania and one of 16 full or partial public school districts operating in Mercer County.

Extracurriculars
West Middlesex Area School District offers a wide variety of clubs, activities and an extensive sports program.

Sports
The district funds:

Boys
Baseball - AA
Basketball- AA
Cross Country - A
Football - A
Golf - AA
Indoor Track and Field - AAAA
Soccer - A
Track and Field - AA
Wrestling	- AA

Girls
Basketball - AA
Cross Country - A
Golf - AA
Indoor Track and Field - AAAA
Soccer (Fall) - A
Softball - A
Girls' Tennis - AA
Track and Field - AA
Volleyball - A

Junior High School Sports

Boys
Baseball
Basketball
Cross Country
Football
Soccer
Track and Field
Wrestling	

Girls
Basketball
Cross Country
Soccer (Fall)
Track and Field
Volleyball

According to PIAA directory July 2013

References

School districts in Mercer County, Pennsylvania